KitamataDam is a gravity dam located in Toyama prefecture in Japan. The dam is used for power production. The catchment area of the dam is 40 km2. The dam impounds about 67  ha of land when full and can store 690 thousand cubic meters of water. The construction of the dam was started on 1980 and completed in 1986.

References

Dams in Toyama Prefecture
1986 establishments in Japan